Im Augenblick ( At the Moment) is the fifth studio album by German singer Sarah Lombardi. It was released through Ariola Records on 	23 April 2021 in German-speaking Europe.

Track listing

Charts

Release history

References

2021 albums
German-language albums
Sarah Lombardi albums